Narciso Fernández de Heredia y Begines de los Ríos, iure uxoris Count of Ofalia, 2nd Count of Heredia-Spínola, 1st Marquess of Heredia, GE (1775–1847) was a Spanish nobleman, politician and diplomat who served as Prime Minister of Spain and as Minister of State from 16 December 1837 to 6 September 1838, in the reign of Isabella II.

Biography
Heredia was the eldest son of Narciso Fernández de Heredia, 1st Count of Heredia-Spínola, and his wife María de las Mercedes Begines de los Ríos y Bejarano. He married firstly in 1803 María de la Soledad Pontejos y Cerviño, and had two daughters by this marriage:

Doña Narcisa Fernández de Heredia, 3rd Countess of Heredia-Spínola (1804–1828), married to Miguel Francisco Arízcun, 5th Marquess of Iturbieta.
Doña Josefa Fernández de Heredia y Cerviño, married her cousin Narciso Fernández de Heredia, 1st Count of Doña Marina.

Heredia married secondly in 1820 María Dolores de Salabert, 4th Countess of Ofalia, second daughter of Félix de Salabert, 5th Marquess of la Torrecilla and Petra de Torres y Feloaga.

Notes

References
Cadenas y Vicent, Vicente de, Extracto de los Expedientes de la Orden de Carlos III, Madrid, Higalguía, 1982. 

|-

|-

Counts of Spain
Marquesses of Spain
Prime Ministers of Spain
Foreign ministers of Spain
1775 births
1847 deaths
Moderate Party (Spain) politicians
19th-century Spanish politicians
Grandees of Spain
Ambassadors of Spain to the United Kingdom of Great Britain and Ireland